"Midnight Rider" is a 1970 song by the Allman Brothers Band.

Midnight Rider(s) may also refer to:
Midnight Rider (film), an uncompleted biographical film about Gregg Allman
Midnight Rider, a 1977 album by Tommy James
"The Midnight Rider", a former ring name of wrestler Dusty Rhodes
 Midnight Riders (MLS supporters association), the independent supporters association for the New England Revolution of Major League Soccer
 Midnight Riders, a fictional rock band from the video game Left 4 Dead 2

See also
Midnight Ridazz, late-night group bicycle ride
Midnight Ride (disambiguation)